St. Thomas More School is a college-preparatory school in Oakdale, Connecticut, United States. The school serves grades 8–12 and postgraduate courses. It is accredited by the New England Association of Schools and Colleges and is a member of the National Association of Independent Schools.

History
The school was established in 1962 by James Hanrahan. Located on Gardner Lake, the school also includes international students from several countries; St. Thomas More was founded as a Christian school, however, students from other religions are also welcomed and accepted.

Athletics 
Sports offered at St. Thomas More include baseball, basketball, football, judo, lacrosse, sailing, soccer, tennis, and wrestling.

Over the years, the athletics program at St. Thomas More gained national relevance, especially in basketball, with athletes joining the school to improve their grades and get better opportunities to play at NCAA Division I level. Several school alumni played at Division I and professional level.

Notable alumni

Bryon Allen (born 1992), basketball player for Hapoel Eilat of the Israeli Basketball Premier League
Dwayne Anderson, professional basketball player and coach
C. J. Asuncion-Byrd, professional basketball player
Charlie Brown Jr. (born 1997), NBA player
Trahson Burrell, professional basketball player
Ed Cota, professional basketball player
Schea Cotton, professional basketball player
Ajou Deng, professional basketball player
Quincy Douby, NBA player
Andre Drummond, NBA player
Devin Ebanks, NBA player
A. J. English, professional basketball player
 Shahar Gordon (born 1980), Israeli professional basketball player
Carl Krauser, professional basketball player
Damion Lee, NBA player
Gabe Levin (born 1994), American-Israeli basketball player in the Israeli Basketball Premier League
Charles Minlend (born 1973), professional basketball player, 2003 Israeli Basketball Premier League MVP
Josh A. Moore, professional basketball player
Eric Paschall, NBA player
Omari Spellman, NBA player
Edwin Ubiles, NBA player
Mario Van Peebles, actor and director
Winston Venable, professional football player
Yuta Watanabe, NBA player

References

External links
St. Thomas More basketball page at MaxPreps.com

Catholic schools in Connecticut
Educational institutions established in 1962
1962 establishments in Connecticut
Boarding schools in Connecticut
Schools in New London County, Connecticut
High school basketball in the United States
Private high schools in Connecticut